The New York Red Cross Tournament was an American golf tournament. The event was won by legendary golfer Byron Nelson and earned PGA Tour-level status.

History 
The tournament was hosted by Wykagyl Country Club in New Rochelle, New York. The event was played from June 15 − 18, 1944. Byron Nelson won with a score of 275, four ahead of Vic Ghezzi. Nelson was tied for the lead after two rounds and then scored a third round 66 (−6) to give him a five-stroke lead over Ghezzi. Nelson had a final round 71 against Ghezzi's 70 and defeated him by four strokes. Mike Turnesa was third, nine shots behind Nelson.

Winners

References

Former PGA Tour events
Golf in New York (state)